116th Street runs from Riverside Drive, overlooking the Hudson River, to the East River, through the New York City borough of Manhattan. It traverses the neighborhoods of Morningside Heights, Harlem, and Spanish Harlem; the street is interrupted between Morningside Heights and Harlem by Morningside Park.

History

Description

West Side

The western entrance to 116th Street at Riverside Drive is flanked by a pair of white apartment buildings with curved facades, The Colosseum and The Paterno.

The New York Times has said that the  "opposing curves, (form) a gateway as impressive as any publicly built arch or plaza in New York.  The unusual curves of the road are the result of an 1897 plan to make the land between Claremont Avenue and Riverside Drive into a public park in order to give veterans parades with a large park adjacent to Grant's Tomb as a terminus. The street was redesigned so that a vehicle or a parade coming up Riverside Drive would swing onto 116th Street in a gracious curve, then immediately swing north onto Claremont Avenue following a second curve. The city never appropriated funds to buy the land, but the curves remain.  The top of The Paterno is capped with an architectural fancy masking a water tower in a shape that conjures up a section of Mansard roof, complete with dormer window.  It is visible from the gates of Columbia University at Broadway and 116th Street.

The intersection of 116th Street and Broadway, is the location of the main entrance of Columbia University, the city's Ivy League school. Until the 1950s, the street ran uninterrupted through Morningside Heights from Riverside Drive to Morningside Park. In 1953, during Dwight D. Eisenhower's presidency at Columbia, however, the block between Broadway and Amsterdam Avenue was permanently closed to vehicular traffic and was turned into a pedestrian way called "College Walk." The street had been ceded to Columbia in exchange for a payment of $1,000. The street is again interrupted where it meets Morningside Drive, this time by the steep downward slope of Morningside Park.

East Side

The main, east-west thoroughfare portion of 116th Street begins at the eastern edge of Morningside Park and runs east through central Harlem. A large West African immigrant community has developed in central Harlem with stores, bakeries and cafés along 116th Street west of St. Nicholas Avenue. This community has been called Little Senegal or Le Petit Senegal.

At Lenox Ave., the street runs past the Malcolm Shabazz Mosque, formerly the Mosque No. 7. The building was erected as the Lenox Casino.

East of Fifth Avenue, 116th Street has historically been the primary business hub of Spanish Harlem. From Lexington Avenue to First Avenue, the street is lined with businesses selling food, clothing, and other specialty and ethnically specific goods to a Spanish-speaking clientele.  East 116th Street terminates at FDR Drive, the site of the East River Plaza, a retail mall complex with large commercial tenants Costco, Aldi and Target.

Transportation
Subway stations on 116th Street are, from west to east:

The  New York City Bus route also stops on the street.

In popular culture
116th Street in Harlem is the background for the book The Street (1946) by Ann Petry. The story is about Lutie Johnson, a single young black mother, who moves to 116th Street to give her son better opportunities.

116th Street and Broadway is the opening scene of The Caine Mutiny (1951) by Herman Wouk as Willie Keith is being dropped off by his mother to join the Navy in World War II.

Gallery

See also 
 116th Street Crew, a Mafia crew with the Genovese crime family
 Ciro Terranova, the "Artichoke King" moved to 138 East 116th Street after declaring bankruptcy and foreclosing on his home
 Morello crime family, the Morellos owned the building at 338 East 116th Street, the headquarters of the Aignatz Aflorio Co-operative association

References 

Harlem
116